Ronald James Brown (born March 31, 1961) is an American former athlete and American football wide receiver, winner of the gold medal in the 4 × 100 metres relay at the 1984 Summer Olympics. He went to Arizona State University.

High school career
Brown played high school football at powerhouse Baldwin Park High School in Baldwin Park, California until his senior year.  He then moved to Northern California and played for Northgate High School in Walnut Creek.

Track and field

Brown was also a track star, he ran the second leg in the 4 × 100 metres relay team that won the gold medal and set the world record in the 1984 Summer Olympics in Los Angeles, with a time of 37.83 seconds.

Brown also competed in the 60 meters, 100 meters and 200 meters, posting personal bests of 6.64 seconds, 10.01 seconds and 20.44 seconds, respectively.

Football career
After the Olympics, Brown joined the Los Angeles Rams. He caught 23 passes in 1984 for 478 yards with four touchdowns as a rookie in 1984 before being tasked to return kicks the following year. In 1985, he returned 28 kicks for 918 yards for three touchdowns (his touchdowns and 32.8 yards per return were league highs). This resulted in Pro Bowl and All-Pro honors. Only his 1989 year would exceed that season, with him returning 47 (a league high) for 968 yards. In his eight seasons, he recorded 1,000 all-purpose yards (receiving + returns) four times (1985-87, 1989) before his career ended in 1990 at the age of 30.

Brown appeared in the 1986 Rams promotional video, Let's Ram It, where he went by the name "Speedball Brown" and claimed to be the fastest man in town.

Personal bests

References

External links
 

1961 births
Living people
American football return specialists
American football wide receivers
American male sprinters
Athletes (track and field) at the 1984 Summer Olympics
Arizona State Sun Devils football players
Los Angeles Raiders players
Los Angeles Rams players
Medalists at the 1984 Summer Olympics
National Conference Pro Bowl players
Olympic gold medalists for the United States in track and field
People from Baldwin Park, California
Sportspeople from Walnut Creek, California
Players of American football from Los Angeles
Track and field athletes from Los Angeles
Track and field athletes in the National Football League
USA Indoor Track and Field Championships winners